Pavel Sofin (born 4 September 1981) is a Russian shot putter.

His personal best is 20.82 metres, achieved in September 2009 in Thessaloniki. He has 20.68 metres on the indoor track, achieved in March 2006 in Moscow.

International competitions

References

 

1981 births
Living people
Russian male shot putters
Olympic male shot putters
Olympic athletes of Russia
Athletes (track and field) at the 2004 Summer Olympics
Athletes (track and field) at the 2008 Summer Olympics
World Athletics Championships athletes for Russia
Russian Athletics Championships winners
21st-century Russian people